Bolt on Neck is a collaboration album between guitarist Buckethead and That 1 Guy, collectively calling themselves Frankenstein Brothers. The album was originally only available on tour as of September 17, 2008 and sold at Buckethead shows, and released online at TDRS Music as of December 1.

The album cover has been listed in The Wolf's Top 10 of 2008, stating "The artist does a good job of blending simplicity and subtlety, ending with a creation that could be stared at throughout the entire length of the album."

Track listing

Credits 

 Music by Buckethead and That 1 Guy.
 Recorded, mixed, mastered and artwork design by Travis Dickerson.

References 

2008 albums
Buckethead albums
TDRS Music albums